The Prime Minister of Nagorno-Karabakh Republic was the head of government of the unrecognized Nagorno-Karabakh Republic between 1992 and 2017.

The position of Prime Minister was established in 1992, and was appointed by the head of state—the President. In a constitutional referendum held in 2017, citizens voted in favour of transforming Artsakh into a presidential system and the office of Prime Minister was abolished. The President become both the head of state and the head of government.

This is a list of the prime ministers of the Republic of Artsakh.

List of prime ministers (1992–2017)

See also
 President of Artsakh
 President of the National Assembly of Artsakh
 State Minister of Artsakh

References

Executive branch of the government of the Republic of Artsakh
Artsakh, Prime Ministers of
Former ministries